Chenisides is a genus of African dwarf spiders that was first described by J. Denis in 1962.  it contains only two species: C. bispinigera and C. monospina.

See also
 List of Linyphiidae species

References

Araneomorphae genera
Linyphiidae
Spiders of Africa